Gintarė Bražaitė (born 19 August 1992) is a Lithuanian Olympian weightlifter and coach. She multiple times broke Lithuanian women's national record.

Bražaitė competed at the 2019 World Weightlifting Championships, where she finished in 13th place. Bražaitė finished 5th at the 2021 European Weightlifting Championships

References

External links
 

1992 births
Living people
Lithuanian female weightlifters
Sportspeople from Anykščiai
21st-century Lithuanian women